Obscurities is a compilation album by Stephin Merritt, released in 2011 on Merge Records. It consists of B-sides, compilations cuts, and various other previously unreleased material.

Reception

On Metacritic, Obscurities has a score of 74 out of 100, indicating that it has received "generally favorable reviews" from critics. The most positive review came from Robert Christgau, who gave the album an A− grade and wrote that he was "swept off [his] feet by Merritt thoughtfully intoning some little green men's "Song From Venus.""

Track listing
Forever and a Day
Rats in the Garbage of the Western World
I Don't Believe You
Plant White Roses
Rot in the Sun
The Sun and the Sea and the Sky
Yet Another Girl
Scream ('Till You Make the Scene)
The Song from Venus
Beach-a-Boop-Boop
When I'm Not Looking, You're Not There
Take Ecstasy With Me (vocals by Susan Anway)
When You're Young and in Love
You Are Not My Mother and I Want to Go Home

References

Stephin Merritt albums
2011 compilation albums
Merge Records compilation albums
Indie pop compilation albums